Jan Antoni Szczepański (20 November 1939 in Małecz – 15 January 2017 in Warsaw) was a Polish boxer, who won the gold medal in the lightweight division (– 60 kg) at the 1972 Summer Olympics in Munich, West Germany. In the final he defeated Hungary's László Orbán on points (5:0).

Szczepański died on 15 January 2017, after long illness.

Olympic results 
1st round bye
Defeated Kasamiro Kashri Marchlo (Sudan) 5-0
Defeated James Busceme (United States) 5-0
Defeated Charlie Nash (Ireland) RSC 3
Defeated Samuel Mbugua (Kenya) walk-over
Defeated László Orbán (Hungary) 5-0

References

External links
 databaseOlympics

1939 births
2017 deaths
People from Tomaszów Mazowiecki County
Polish male boxers
Lightweight boxers
Boxers at the 1972 Summer Olympics
Olympic boxers of Poland
Olympic gold medalists for Poland
Olympic medalists in boxing
Medalists at the 1972 Summer Olympics
Sportspeople from Łódź Voivodeship